Thurumbur is a village in the Papanasam taluk of Thanjavur district, Tamil Nadu, India.
Its temples are Sri sarva sakthi mariyamman temple, Ponniyamman temple, Ayyanaar temple, vinayagar temple, perumaal temple. It is bounded by manniyaaru in the north, Konkan in the south. In the east and west there is no notable physical boundary.
It is bounded by the villages like thaavarangudi in the west, paathirimedu in the east, maanjeri in north and adhanoor in the south.
This village has a fertile plain region where paddy, sugarcane, onion, cotton, black gram and vegetables were grown.

Demographics 

As per the 2001 census, Thurumbur had a total population of 2420 with 1214 males and 1206 females. The sex ratio was 993. The literacy rate was 65.12.

References 

 

Villages in Thanjavur district